Brown Township is one of fourteen townships in Morgan County, Indiana, United States. As of the 2010 census, its population was 12,973 and it contained 5,384 housing units.

Geography

Cities, towns, villages
 Mooresville (vast majority)

Unincorporated towns
 Brookmoor at 
 Ridgewood at 
 Young at 
(This list is based on USGS data and may include former settlements.)

Cemeteries
The township contains these two cemeteries: Brooklyn Rest Park and Monical.

Major highways
  Indiana State Road 67

Airports and landing strips
 Kellys Airfield

Landmarks
 Pioneer Park

Education
 Mooresville Consolidated School Corporation

Brown Township residents may obtain a free library card from the Mooresville Public Library in Mooresville.

Political districts
 Indiana's 4th congressional district
 State House District 47
 State House District 91
 State Senate District 37

References
 
 United States Census Bureau 2008 TIGER/Line Shapefiles
 IndianaMap

External links
 Indiana Township Association
 United Township Association of Indiana
 City-Data.com page for Brown Township

Townships in Morgan County, Indiana
Townships in Indiana